Paul Raymond Hutchins  (5 April 1945 – 14 March 2019) was a  British tennis player and Davis Cup player.

He was the longest serving British Davis Cup captain, being in charge for 31 matches and 13 years, including the 1978 final.

Biography
Born in Bristol, Hutchins was a Davis Cup player and Captain for Great Britain from 1975 to 1987. In 1968, he made the third round of the men's singles at the French Open and the US Open, and the quarterfinals of the men's doubles at the French, partnering Gerald Battrick.

Hutchins largely stopped playing at the age of 25 due to injury, though he did play a few matches in 1972 & 1973.

He had four children, the most noteworthy being Ross, a former ATP Pro.

References

External links
 
 
 

1945 births
2019 deaths
Members of the Order of the British Empire
English male tennis players
British male tennis players
Tennis people from Bristol
Neurological disease deaths in the United Kingdom
Deaths from motor neuron disease